Italy at the Olympics in athletics competed in all editions of the Summer Olympic Games with the exception of the 1904 Summer Olympics. The Italian National Olympic Committee (CONI) is the National Olympic Committee for the Italy.

Placing table
World Athletics placing table assigns points to the top eight athletes in the final, with eight points to first place, seven to second place, and so on until one point for eighth place. Teams or athletes that do not finish or are disqualified do not receive points.

Medals

19 of the 60 medals come from race walk.

Results by event

See also
Athletics at the Summer Olympics
Athletics in Italy
Italy national athletics team
Italy at the Summer Olympics

References

External links
  (CONI)
  (FIDAL)

Athletics
Oly
Athletics in Italy